Yuktali is a rural locality (a settlement) Yuktalinsky Selsoviet of Tyndinsky District, Amur Oblast, Russia. The population was 1,240 as of 2018. There are 28 streets.

Geography 
Yuktali is located on the Nyukzha River, 344 km northwest of Tynda (the district's administrative centre) by road. Ust-Nyukzha is the nearest rural locality.

References 

Rural localities in Tyndinsky District